Acherontides is a genus of springtails in the family Hypogastruridae. There are about 11 described species in Acherontides.

Species
These 11 species belong to the genus Acherontides:
 Acherontides atoyacensis Bonet, 1945 i c g
 Acherontides bullocki Palacios-Vargas & Gòmez-Anaya, 1996 i c g
 Acherontides eleonorae Palacios-Vargas & Gnaspini-Netto, 1993 i c g
 Acherontides huetheri Deharveng & Diaz, 1984 i c g
 Acherontides juxtlahuacaensis Palacios-Vargas & Gòmez-Anaya, 1996 i c g
 Acherontides leo Palacios-Vargas & Gnaspini-Netto, 1992 i c g
 Acherontides pappogeomysae Palacios-Vargas & Gòmez-Anaya, 1996 i c g
 Acherontides peruensis Hüther, 1975 i c g
 Acherontides potosinus Bonet, 1946 i c g
 Acherontides spinus (Christiansen & Reddell, 1986) i c g
 Acherontides tanasachiae (Gruia, 1969) i c g
Data sources: i = ITIS, c = Catalogue of Life, g = GBIF, b = Bugguide.net

References

Further reading

 
 
 

Collembola
Springtail genera